Sir John Addis KCMG (11 June 1914 – 31 July 1983) was a British diplomat, ambassador to Laos, the Philippines and China, and a collector of Ming porcelain which he gave to the British Museum.

Career
John Mansfield Addis was educated at Rugby School and Christ Church, Oxford, and joined the Foreign Office in 1938. After postings at Nanking, Peking and the Foreign Office, he was ambassador to Laos 1960–62; Fellow at the Harvard Center for International Affairs 1962–63; ambassador to the Philippines 1963–70; Senior Civilian Instructor at the Imperial Defence College 1970–71; and ambassador to China 1972–74. After retiring from the Diplomatic Service, Addis was Senior Research Fellow in Contemporary Chinese Studies at Wolfson College, Oxford, 1975–82. He was a trustee of the British Museum.

Honours

Addis was appointed CMG in the New Year Honours of 1959 and knighted KCMG in the New Year Honours of 1973.

Sir John Addis will be remembered with gratitude, respect and affection at the British Museum. His gift in 1975 of twenty-three pieces of early Chinese porcelain of superb quality and importance was not only one of the Museum's major benefactions this century but also a carefully thought out addition to the existing collections, every piece having been deliberately chosen in advance to fill gaps in the permanent exhibition.— Lawrence Smith, Keeper of Oriental Antiquities, British Museum

Publications
 The India-China border question, Harvard University, 1963.
Chinese ceramics from datable tombs, Philip Wilson Publishers, 1978.

References

Further reading
ADDIS, Sir John (Mansfield), Who Was Who, A & C Black, 1920–2008; online edn, Oxford University Press, Dec 2012
Sir John Addis (obituary), The Times, London, 2 August 1983, page 12
Sir John M Addis (Biographical details), British Museum

External links
Addis, Sir John Mansfield – archive material listed at the Archives Hub
 Papers relating to the diplomatic career and scholarly interests of Sir John Mansfield Addis are held at SOAS Archives

1914 births
1983 deaths
People educated at Rugby School
Alumni of Christ Church, Oxford
British people of World War II
Ambassadors of the United Kingdom to Laos
Ambassadors of the United Kingdom to the Philippines
Ambassadors of the United Kingdom to China
Knights Commander of the Order of St Michael and St George
Fellows of Wolfson College, Oxford
Trustees of the British Museum
Historians of East Asian art